Tabunsky District is an administrative and municipal district (raion), one of the fifty-nine in Altai Krai, Russia. It is located in the northwest of the krai. Its administrative center is the rural locality (a selo) of Tabuny. As of the 2010 Census, the total population of the district was 10,057, with the population of Tabuny accounting for 38.5% of that number.

References

Notes

Sources

Districts of Altai Krai